Anna Edwards may refer to:

 Anna Edwards (equestrian) (born 1984), British equestrian 
 Anna Cheney Edwards (1835–1930), American educator 
 Anna Leonowens (1831–1915), née Edwards, travel writer, educator and social activist

See also
 Anne Edwards (disambiguation)
 Annie Edwards (c. 1830–1896), English novelist